The year 2002 is the fourth year in the history of King of the Cage, a mixed martial arts promotion based in the United States. In 2002 King of the Cage held 9 events, KOTC 7: Cold Blood.

Title fights

Events list

KOTC 12: Cold Blood

KOTC 12: Cold Blood was an event held on February 9, 2002 at the Soboba Casino in San Jacinto, California, United States.

Results

KOTC 13: Revolution

KOTC 13: Revolution was an event held on May 17, 2002 at the Silver Legacy Resort Casino in Reno, Nevada, United States.

Results

KOTC 14: 5150

KOTC 14: 5150 was an event held on June 19, 2002 at the Santa Ana Star Casino in Bernalillo, New Mexico, United States.

Results

KOTC 15: Bad Intentions

KOTC 15: Bad Intentions was an event held on June 22, 2002 at the Soboba Casino in San Jacinto, California, United States.

Results

KOTC 16: Double Cross

KOTC 16: Double Cross was an event held on August 2, 2002 at the Soboba Casino in San Jacinto, California, United States.

Results

KOTC 17: Nuclear Explosion

KOTC 17: Nuclear Explosion was an event held on October 19, 2002 at the Soboba Casino in San Jacinto, California, United States.

Results

KOTC 18: Sudden Impact

KOTC 18: Sudden Impact was an event held on November 1, 2002 at the Silver Legacy Resort Casino in Reno, Nevada, United States.

Results

KOTC 19: Street Fighter

KOTC 19: Street Fighter was an event held on December 7, 2002 at the Soboba Casino in San Jacinto, California, United States.

Results

KOTC 20: Crossroads

KOTC 20: Crossroads was an event held on December 15, 2002 at the Santa Ana Star Casino in Bernalillo, New Mexico, United States.

Results

See also 
 King of the Cage
 List of King of the Cage events
 List of King of the Cage champions

References

King of the Cage events
2002 in mixed martial arts